The TVR Speed Eight is a naturally-aspirated V8 car engine designed by TVR and manufactured from 1996 to 2003. The engine was intended to power the TVR Griffith and the TVR Chimaera, but delays in its production meant that it powered only the TVR Cerbera and the TVR Tuscan Challenge. It was first engine offered by TVR that was both designed and built in-house.  The reason behind the engine's development and production was that Rover was bought by BMW in 1994, and Peter Wheeler, the owner of TVR at the time, feared that BMW would drop the Rover V8 engine used in TVRs since the early 80's. Wheeler contracted Al Melling to design a brand-new V8 engine to power the TVR Cerbera that TVR could also sell to other car manufacturers.  TVR ceased manufacturing the design when the Cerbera was discontinued in 2003.

The engine was designed by Melling, along with John Ravenscroft and Peter Wheeler. Its production code-name was "AJP8" (A=Al, J=John, P=Peter); this naming convention was subsequently used for the Speed Six engine's "AJP6" code-name. The Speed Eight featured many aspects found in a racing engine, such as a flat plane crankshaft, a 75-degree angle between the cylinder banks, a SOHC arrangement operating two valves per cylinder, and sequential fuel injection.

Two versions of the Speed Eight engine were offered by TVR, one displacing 4.2L and producing , and the other displacing 4.5L and producing . A Red Rose conversion was made available that increased output to  when using fuel with a minimum octane rating of 97 RON. The Red Rose upgrade included reshaped intake and exhaust ports, higher compression, and an ECU that can be switched between two sets of fueling and ignition maps (for 95 RON and 97 RON fuel, respectively).

The Speed Eight engine had a high specific output for a normally aspirated engine at the time, with 83.3 bhp/L for the 4.2L, 93.3 bhp/L for the 4.5L, and 97.7 bhp/L for the Red Rose-specification 4.5L engine. Another notable aspect is the weight of the engine, which is  dry.

References 

TVR engines
V8 engines